John Mark McMillan (born November 27, 1979) is an American singer, songwriter and musician.

Career
In 2002, McMillan released his debut album Hope Anthology, Volume 1. This independent album was followed by The Song Inside: The Sounds of Breaking Down in 2005, which included the track "How He Loves". The song was successful despite the album's independent release, and has been covered by several well-known artists within the Christian music industry including the David Crowder Band. McMillan released his third album, The Medicine, independently in 2008, and re-released the same album under the Integrity Music label in 2010. Economy followed in 2011 with Integrity Music. In 2014, McMillan and Josh Lujan Loveless formed Lionhawk Records, and Borderland became the first album released under this new label. Borderland was released after a successful Kickstarter campaign, where he raised close to double the goal. The album debuted at No. 41 on the Billboard 200 and No. 4 on Billboards Top Christian Album chart. McMillan's subsequent studio albums were all released via Lionhawk Records. His next studio album, Mercury & Lightning, was released in 2017, and his most recent studio album, Peopled with Dreams was released in 2020.

Personal life
McMillan's parents are Robert "Robin" Agnew McMillan and Donna Boggs Wilson McMillan, and he is the eldest of four siblings.  He has two younger brothers, Christopher Robin and Andrew Wilson, followed by his only sister, Mary Kathryn. He grew up going to church and is a long-time Christian.

He is married to Sarah Kathryn McMillan (née Williams), who is from Vidalia, Georgia. They have three children.

Discography

Studio albums

Extended plays

Live albums

Singles 

 "Wilderlove" (2016)
 "No Country" (2016)
 "Enemy, love." (2017)
 "The Road, The Rocks, and The Weeds" (2019)
 "Bright Abyss" (2019)
 "Juggernaut" (2019)
 "Pilgrim" (2020)
"Deliver Me" (2021)
"Re-enchanted World" (2021)
"Roaring Thunder" (2021)
"Has It Been You" (2021)
"Prove My Love" (2022)
"Atlanta" (2022)

Notes

References

External links
 
 

1979 births
American performers of Christian music
Living people
Musicians from North Carolina